Palatine Community Consolidated School District 15, often initialized CCSD15, is a school district in the suburbs of Chicago, Illinois with its headquarters in the Joseph M. Kiszka Educational Service Center in Palatine. It is the second-largest elementary-only school district and 19th-largest in Illinois by student enrollment. It serves all or portions of Palatine, Rolling Meadows, Hoffman Estates, Arlington Heights, Inverness, Schaumburg, and South Barrington.

Schools
The district has one preschool early childhood center, 15 elementary schools, four junior high schools, and one alternative public day school.

Junior high schools
 Carl Sandburg Junior High School (Rolling Meadows)
 Plum Grove Junior High School (Rolling Meadows)
 Walter R. Sundling Junior High School (Palatine)
 Winston Campus Junior High School (Palatine)

Elementary schools
 Central Road School (Rolling Meadows)
 Frank C. Whiteley School (Hoffman Estates)
 Gray M. Sanborn School (Palatine)
 Hunting Ridge School (Palatine)
 Jane Addams School (Palatine)
 Kimball Hill School (Rolling Meadows)
 Lake Louise School (Palatine)
 Lincoln School (Palatine)
 Marion Jordan School (Palatine)
 Pleasant Hill School (Palatine)
 Stuart R. Paddock School (Palatine)
 Thomas Jefferson School (Hoffman Estates)
 Virginia Lake School (Palatine)
 Willow Bend School (Rolling Meadows)
 Winston Campus Elementary School (Palatine)

Alternative school
 John G. Conyers Learning Academy (Rolling Meadows)

Defunct schools
 Hillside School (early 1960s)
 Cardinal Drive School (1976)
 Joel Wood School (1979)
 Jonas E. Salk School (1981)

Media

References

External links

 Community Consolidated School District 15

School districts in Cook County, Illinois
Palatine, Illinois
Hoffman Estates, Illinois
School districts established in 1946
1946 establishments in Illinois